Račica is a settlement east of Loka pri Zidanem Mostu on the left bank of the Sava River in the Municipality of Sevnica in east-central Slovenia. The area is part of the historical region of Styria. The municipality is now included in the Lower Sava Statistical Region.

References

External links
Račica at Geopedia

Populated places in the Municipality of Sevnica